This is a list of the Monitor Latino General number-one songs of 2014. Chart rankings are based on airplay across radio stations in Mexico using the Radio Tracking Data, LLC in real time. Charts are ranked from Monday to Sunday.

Besides the General chart, Monitor Latino publishes "Pop", "Popular" (Regional Mexican music) and "Anglo" charts. Monitor Latino provides two lists for each of these charts: the "Audience" list ranks the songs according to the estimated number of people that listened to them on the radio during the week.
The "Tocadas" (Spins) list ranks the songs according to the number of times they were played on the radio during the week. In 2014, the "Regional" chart was renamed as "Popular".

Chart history

General

Pop

Popular
This chart, which had been called "Grupero" from 2002 to 2006 and "Regional" from 2007 to 2013, once again changed its name to "Popular" in 2014.

Anglo

See also
List of Top 20 songs for 2014 in Mexico
List of number-one albums of 2014 (Mexico)

References

2014
Number-one songs
Mexico